A Southern Revelation is the seventh studio album by the Los Angeles-based metal band My Ruin, released as a free download from their bandcamp page. Sound Sphere reviewed the album as "most impressive and emotional offering yet".

Track listing
 "Tennessee Elegy" - 3:35
 "Highly Explosive" - 3:56
 "Walk of Shame" - 4:20
 "Deconsecrated" - 4:04
 "Middle Finger" - 4:20
 "Vultures" - 4:09
 "Seventh Sacrament" - 3:11
 "Reckoning" - 4:19
 "The Soulless Beast" - 4:07
 "Mean Street" (Van Halen cover) - 4:53

References

My Ruin albums
2011 albums